The HSL 3 is a Belgian high-speed rail line. It connects Liège to the German border near Aachen.

The line was technically completed in October 2007; however, it did not come into operation until 14 June 2009, when ICE trains began service. Thalys trains have been using the line since 13 December 2009. The interval between completion of the line and its actual use was due to difficulties in the implementation of the safety system ETCS level 2, specifically, finding trains with ERTMS fitted.

Together with the HSL 2 and HSL 1 to the French border, the combined eastward high-speed line has greatly reduced journey times between Brussels, Paris and Germany. HSL 3 has cut Liège – Cologne journey times from 1 h 23 min to 1 h 1 min.  HSL 3 is used only by international Thalys and ICE trains, as opposed to HSL 2, which is also used for fast internal InterCity services.

Route

The dedicated high-speed tracks branch off from the "slow" line at the bridge over the Ourthe, between Angleur and Chênée stations in the suburbs of Liège.

The line then runs parallel to the A3 motorway with a speed limit of  shortly after the village of Walhorn, it passes under the A3 in a cut-and-cover section, and rejoins the regular line.

Beyond the border, high-speed trains travel along upgraded existing rail lines to Aachen Hauptbahnhof. Trains  use left-hand running along this section (as in Belgium), switching over to right-hand running, which is common in Germany, at Aachen Hauptbahnhof.

Construction
Infrabel, the Belgian rail infrastructure manager, constructed the line through its subsidiary TUC Rail, who built the  line between 2001 and 2007 at a cost of €830m, including ETCS Level 2 signalling.

Dozens of geological layers of differing hardness had to be tunnelled through, lime layers needing to be blasted through with dynamite. The tunnel was built between 14 May 2001 and August 2005.

Gallery

See also
 High-speed rail in Belgium

References

External links
Belgian high-speed rail site 

High-speed railway lines in Belgium
Railway lines opened in 2009
Standard gauge railways in Belgium